Geraldines Patrick Moran (Irish: Gearaltaigh Uí Mhóráin ) are a Gaelic Athletic Association (GAA) club based in Cornelscourt, Dublin. They are one of the oldest clubs in Dublin. Their ground is beside Cornelscourt shopping centre. The club is an amalgamation of 2 clubs- Foxrock Geraldines and Patrick Morans. They currently play Gaelic Football in Dublin AFL Div. 5 and Junior 1 Championship, as well as Minor Football in Division 5 South. Juvenile teams are also at Under 8, Under 9, Under 10, Under 11, Under 12, Under 13, Under 14 and Under 16. Ladies Gaelic and Gaelic for Mothers and Others is also available with the team setup during 2021. During 2021, the adult hurling section was also re-established.

History

Foxrock Geraldines 

Foxrock Geraldines were founded in 1900 and originally called Foxrock Independents until 1903. The club amalgamated with Cabinteely Geraldines and was then known as Foxrock Geraldines. Cabinteely Geraldines themselves named after Lord Edward Fitzgerald were founded in 1886. James Farrell was listed as club secretary and Oliver Whites as captain. Players hailed from Stillorgan, Glenamuick, Deansgrange and Dun Laoghire.

The club was present at the first ever Dublin County Board meeting with Patrick Cunniam their delegate. Cabinteely Geraldines reached the first ever Dublin Senior Football Championship final losing to Feagh McHughs 2-4 to 2-1 in Donnybrook. They reached the final again in 1888 losing to C.J. Kickhams. The club lost many players to Dun Leary Independents in 1890 due to the Parnell Split, a time when many clubs in Dublin disbanded. The club continued onwards until 1903 joining forces with Foxrock Independents. The club went on to win a junior football league in 1907. McGarry of Foxrock Geraldines represented Dublin at junior inter county level in 1915.

They lost several players to Stars of Erin in 1913. From 1900 to the early 1920s the club was to lose many players not only to other clubs but also World War I, the War of Independence and the Civil War. J.J. Clare the Irish Olympic Chairman around this time was also a committed Foxrock Geraldines member.

The club competed at both adult and minor level through the 1930s and 1940s expanding with a juvenile section  in the 1950s and 1960s. The construction of 58 houses in what was then a rural area of Dublin also increased the playing population. Tom Loftus was elected as Dublin County Board Chairman, a position he held from 1960 to 1968. The club won a Conlon Cup in the 1960s however they were to struggle to field in the 1970s and 1980s with the juvenile section disbanding completely meaning the supply of young players began to dry up.

Patrick Morans 

Originally known as Dun Laoghaire Commercials the club was founded in 1920 winning a Dublin Intermediate Football Championship in its first year. The club played both football and hurling and at one stage were a senior hurling club. The club changed its name shortly afterwards to Patrick Morans in memory of a founding member. Patrick Moran from Boyle, Roscommon was involved in the 1916 rising and in 1920 accused of assassination of a British army officer. He was jailed in Kilmainham and later hung in Mountjoy jail in 1921. Moran had during his time in Kilmainham been offered a chance of escape with Frank Teeling a player of the O’Tooles club, Ernie O’Malley and Simon Donnelly. But believing he had a sound alibi Moran turned the opportunity down. A plaque was unveiled and a park named in his honour in 1966 by Éamon de Valera.

Amalgamation 

Both Foxrock Geraldines and Patrick Morans decided to join forces in the early 1970s as both club were experiencing difficulties in fielding. They played senior hurling for three years before football became the dominant sport. The club won several leagues and cups in the 1970s and 1980s bit with the absence of a juvenile section continued to experience difficulties in fielding. A juvenile section was started up in the 1990s and took part in the Wicklow league, however it was short lived and disbanded by 1996. The club won a football cup in 2000 but with the lack of players experienced a drop down the leagues. The juvenile section was eventually restarted and has grown to eight teams today. 2011 was to be a very successful year for the club in its 125 year of existence. The under 14 team won the Division 6 Football feile. The minor football team were division 4A runners up. The club won it first championship in 2011 in Junior Football, one of Dublin's oldest clubs beating one of its newest, Tyrrelstown in the final.

Honours

Cabinteely Geraldines

 Dublin Senior Football Championship Runners Up 1888, 1890

Foxrock Geraldines

 Junior Football League Winners 1907
 Conlon Cup Winners 1960

Dun Laoghire Commercials

 Dublin Intermediate Football Championship 1920

Geraldine Patrick Morans

 Football Cup 2000
 Dublin Division 6 Football Feile Winners (under 14) 2011
 Junior E Football Championship Winners 2011
 Dublin Minor Football League Division 4A Runners Up 2011
 Dublin AFL Div. 7 Winners 2018
 Dublin AFL Div. 8 Play Off Winners 2017
 Dublin AFL Div. 9 Play Off Winners 2014
 Dublin AFL Div. 10S Winners 2013
 Dublin Senior Football Championship Winners (10) 1898, 1899, 1908, 1910, 1914, 1915, 1917, 1940, 1941, 1942

References

Gaelic games clubs in Dún Laoghaire–Rathdown
Gaelic football clubs in Dún Laoghaire–Rathdown